Danai Jekesai Gurira (born February 14, 1978) is a Zimbabwean-American actress and playwright. She is best known for her starring roles as Michonne on the AMC horror drama series The Walking Dead (2012–2020, 2022) and as Okoye in the Marvel Cinematic Universe superhero films, beginning with Black Panther (2018) and most recently appearing in its sequel Black Panther: Wakanda Forever (2022).

Gurira is also the playwright of the Broadway play Eclipsed, for which she was nominated for a Tony Award for Best Play.

Early life and education 
Gurira was born on February 14 1978 in Grinnell, Iowa, to Josephine Gurira, a college librarian, and Roger Gurira, a tenured professor in the Department of Chemistry at Grinnell College (both parents later joined the staff of University of Wisconsin–Platteville). Her parents moved from Southern Rhodesia, which is now Zimbabwe, to the United States in 1964. She is the youngest of four siblings; Shingai and Choni are her sisters and Tare, her brother, is a chiropractor. Gurira lived in Grinnell until December 1983, when at age five she and her family moved back to Harare, the capital of Zimbabwe, after Robert Mugabe rose to power in 1979.

She attended high school at Dominican Convent High School. Afterward, she returned to the United States to study at Macalester College in Saint Paul, Minnesota, graduating with a Bachelor of Arts in psychology. Gurira also earned a Master of Fine Arts in acting from New York University's Tisch School of the Arts.

Career

Early career
Gurira taught playwriting and acting in Liberia, Zimbabwe and South Africa. One of her earliest notable performances occurred in 2001, as a senior at Macalester College. Gurira performed in a production of the Ntozake Shange play For Colored Girls Who Have Considered Suicide / When the Rainbow Is Enuf, directed and choreographed by Dale Ricardo Shields. “She was a very intelligent, strong and independent young lady,” said Shields. “She approached her studies, her classes, with a lot of focus, and you can see the same things in her performance in ‘Black Panther.’ ”

Theater 

Gurira said that she began writing plays in an effort to better utilize her strengths as an actress, and to tell stories that convey ideas about strong women with whom she identifies. As a playwright, she has been commissioned by Yale Repertory Theatre, Center Theatre Group, Playwrights Horizons, and the Royal Court.

Gurira co-wrote and co-starred in In the Continuum, first at Woolly Mammoth Theatre Company and later Off-Broadway, which won her an Obie Award, an Outer Critics Circle Award, and a Helen Hayes Award for Best Lead Actress. In December 2011, In the Continuum commemorated World AIDS Day 2011. Sponsored by the United States Embassy in Zimbabwe, the play was performed at Harare's Theatre and featured the story of two women who were navigating the world after contracting HIV.

In 2009, Gurira made her acting debut on Broadway in August Wilson's play Joe Turner's Come and Gone playing Martha Pentecost.

Gurira's 2012 play The Convert was premiered as a co-production between the Goodman Theatre in Chicago and the McCarter Theatre in New Jersey. Later that year, Gurira received the Whiting Award for an emerging playwright.

In January 2015, Familiar, a play written by Gurira and directed by Rebecca Taichman, opened at Yale Repertory Theatre. It later premiered Off-Broadway in New York at Playwrights Horizons. The play is about family, cultural identity, and the experience of life as a first-generation American, and Gurira has said that it was inspired in part by her family and friends.

In 2015, Lupita Nyong'o starred in Gurira's play, Eclipsed (2009), Off-Broadway at The Public Theater. It was announced that the play would move to Broadway in 2016 at the John Golden Theatre. It was the first play to premiere on Broadway with an all female and black cast and creative team. The play is set in war-torn Liberia and focuses on three women who are living as sex slaves to a rebel commander, as well as one of his former wives, and a relief worker, and follows and how they deal with this difficult situation. It starred Lupita Nyong'o, Akosua Busia, Saycon Sengbloh, Zainab Jah, and Pascale Armand and was directed by Liesl Tommy. The inspiration for Gurira's play was a photo of Colonel Black Diamond, a female freedom fighter from Liberia, in an article in  The New York Times. "Just to see these women standing there, you know, in their jeans and ... fashionable tops and their hair is all done, and they're all carrying AK-47s, was just an image I couldn't get out of my head." The image prompted curiosity about Liberia's fourteen-year civil wars, as well as a research trip to Liberia in 2007. Gurira interviewed more than 30 women who had been raped, among whose daughters that had been taken by rebel fighters and turned into sex slaves. She also spoke to female peace activists who were instrumental in ending the violence. The names of the women in Eclipsed come from the people Gurira met during her travels, whereas the fifth character is unnamed.

She received the 2016 Sam Norkin Award, for Eclipsed and Familiar, presented by the Drama Desk Awards, which said, in part: "Danai Gurira demonstrates great insight, range and depth, bringing a fresh new voice to American theater." Eclipsed was nominated for the Tony Award for Best Play, and won the Tony Award for Best Costume Design in a Play.

Film and television 
Gurira starred in the drama film The Visitor in 2007, for which she won Method Fest Independent Film Festival Award for Best Supporting Actress. She appeared in the 2008 film Ghost Town, the 2010 films 3 Backyards and My Soul to Take, and Restless City in 2011, as well as the television series Law & Order: Criminal Intent, Life on Mars, and Law & Order. From 2010 to 2011, she appeared in the HBO drama series Treme.

In March 2012, AMC announced on a live broadcast that Gurira would join the cast of their horror-drama series The Walking Dead, the highest rated series in cable television history, in its third season. Gurira plays Michonne, a relentless, katana-wielding character who joins a close-knit group in an apocalyptic world. Gurira had to learn how to ride horses for the series, which she enjoyed because it was a physical challenge. In February 2019, reports emerged that Gurira would be exiting the show once she had filmed her last episodes during the tenth season. Gurira's final episode, "What We Become" aired in March 2020, and by the time of her departure, she had been second billed in the opening credits.

In 2013, Gurira played a lead role in director Andrew Dosunmu's independent drama film Mother of George, which premiered at 2013 Sundance Film Festival. Gurira received critical acclaim for her performance as a Nigerian woman struggling to live in the United States. In June 2013, Gurira won the Jean-Claude Gahd Dam award at the 2013 Guys Choice Awards.

Gurira played rapper Tupac Shakur's mother, Afeni Shakur, in All Eyez on Me, a 2017 biopic about the rap star. She then starred in Marvel's film Black Panther, which was released in February 2018. She played Okoye, the head of the Dora Milaje, the personal bodyguards of the Black Panther, and received critical acclaim for her performance. Gurira reprised Okoye in Avengers: Infinity War (2018), Avengers: Endgame (2019), and Black Panther: Wakanda Forever (2022). In 2020, she signed a deal with ABC Studios.

Activism 
In 2008, Gurira appeared at the Global Green Sustainable Design Awards to read a letter written by a New Orleans native displaced by Hurricane Katrina.

In 2011, Gurira co-founded Almasi Arts, an organization dedicated to continuing arts education in Zimbabwe. Gurira currently serves as the Executive Artistic Director.

In 2015, Gurira signed an open letter begun by the ONE Campaign. The letter was addressed to Angela Merkel and Nkosazana Dlamini-Zuma, urging them to focus on women as they serve as the head of the G7 in Germany and the AU in South Africa respectively. The following year, Gurira founded the non-profit organization Love Our Girls, which aims to highlight the issues and challenges that specifically affect women throughout the world. In 2016, Gurira partnered with Johnson & Johnson in the fight against HIV/AIDS.

On December 2, 2018, Gurira was announced as a UN Women Goodwill Ambassador by UN Women Executive Director Phumzile Mlambo-Ngcuka at the Global Citizen Festival in Johannesburg, South Africa. As a UN Women Goodwill Ambassador, Gurira dedicates her support to putting a spotlight on gender equality and women's rights, as well as bringing unheard women's voices front and center.

Personal life 
Gurira is a Christian and lives in Los Angeles, though she regularly spends time in New York City. She speaks four languages: French, Shona, basic Xhosa, and English and stays physically fit through Pilates and cross training.

Filmography

Film

Television

Stage

Video games

Works or publications 
 Gurira, Danai. Running Head: The Neglect of Black Women in Psychology. 2001. Honors paper, Macalester College
 Gurira, Danai, and Nikkole Salter. In the continuum. New York, NY: Samuel French, 2008. 
 Gurira, Danai. Eclipsed. New York: Dramatists Play Service, 2010. 
 Gurira, Danai. The Convert. Washington, DC : Woolly Mammoth Theatre Company, 2013.
 Gurira, Danai. Familiar. New York Public Library for the Performing Arts Billy Rose Theatre Division, 2016.
 Gurira, Danai. Power of women : Lupita Nyong'o. New York: DKC / O&M, 2016.

Awards and nominations

References

External links 

 Danai Gurira (official website)
 
 
 
 In Conversation with Danai Gurira with the American Theatre Wing

1978 births
21st-century American actresses
21st-century American women writers
21st-century American writers
African-American actresses
Actresses from Iowa
Alumni of Dominican Convent High School
American Christians
American dramatists and playwrights
American film actresses
American people of Zimbabwean descent
American Shakespearean actresses
American stage actresses
American television actresses
American women dramatists and playwrights
Living people
Macalester College alumni
Obie Award recipients
Outstanding Performance by a Cast in a Motion Picture Screen Actors Guild Award winners
People from Grinnell, Iowa
People from Poweshiek County, Iowa
Shona people
Tisch School of the Arts alumni
Writers from Iowa
Zimbabwean actresses
Netflix people